Anna Miller may refer to:

 Anna, Lady Miller (1741–1781), English poet, writer, and hostess
 Anna Miller (Home and Away), a fictional character
 Anna Miller, a fictional character in The Lost Room

See also
Anna Miller's, a chain of restaurants in Hawaii and Japan
Anna Miller Corbell (1896–1993), American artist
Anne Miller (disambiguation)